James Peter Patterson (born January 4, 1957) is a former World Cup alpine ski racer for the United States, from Sun Valley, Idaho. At the Winter Olympics, he finished thirteenth in the downhill in 1976 and fifth in 1980. At the time, it tied for the best finish by an American male in an Olympic downhill (with Bill Beck in 1952).

Two years earlier at the 1978 World Championships at Garmisch-Partenkirchen, West Germany, Patterson was the bronze medalist in the combined  event. The combined was then a "paper race", using the results of the downhill, giant slalom, and slalom.

World championship results 

From 1948 through 1980, the Winter Olympics were also the World Championships for alpine skiing.

Olympic results

References

External links
 
 Pete Patterson World Cup standings at the International Ski Federation
 
 
U.S. Ski and Snowboard Hall of Fame – Pete Patterson

1957 births
Living people
American male alpine skiers
Olympic alpine skiers of the United States
Alpine skiers at the 1976 Winter Olympics
Alpine skiers at the 1980 Winter Olympics
People from Sun Valley, Idaho